Ron Rinehart (born January 25, 1965) is an American thrash metal vocalist. He is the lead singer for the American thrash metal band Dark Angel. His stints were from 1987 (after the departure of previous vocalist Don Doty) until the band's dissolution in 1992, and again from 2002 to 2005, when they were reunited.  In October 2013, Dark Angel announced another reunion, again featuring Rinehart.

He was first featured on the Dark Angel album Leave Scars (1989), followed by Live Scars (1990), and their latest studio album to date Time Does Not Heal (1991). He also had a guest vocalist appearance on thrash metal band Viking's album Man of Straw.

After Dark Angel's dissolution, Rinehart and bandmate Eric Meyer went on to form a band called Hunger. They released a three track demo the following year. He has also played in the Christian rock band Oil, but left in 2004 to pursue other musical interests.

References

1965 births
Living people
American heavy metal singers
Converts to Christianity
Dark Angel (band) members